Elina Nechayeva (born 10 November 1991) is an Estonian soprano. She represented Estonia in the Eurovision Song Contest 2018 in Lisbon, Portugal, with the song "La forza".

Career
In 2009, she made her public debut in the third season of Eesti otsib superstaari, where she participated, but was eliminated in the preliminary girls' round. She graduated from Tallinn French School in 2011. She participated in the ETV competition Klassikatähed 2014 and was one of the three finalists. In 2016, she graduated from the Estonian Academy of Music and Theatre with a master's degree in classical singing. Nechayeva was one of the hosts for the semi-finals of Eesti Laul 2017, along with Marko Reikop. On 3 March 2018, Nechayeva won Eesti Laul 2018 with the Italian-language song "La forza", and she represented Estonia in the Eurovision Song Contest 2018 and came in 8th in the Grand Final.

She also made an appearance in the 2020 American musical comedy film Eurovision Song Contest: The Story of Fire Saga.

She finished second in the second season of the Estonian version of Masked Singer, playing ‘the Phoenix’.

She returned to Eesti Laul in 2022 with the song "Remedy", written by Sven Lõhmus and finishing 8th in the final.

IN theatre, she has played Giannetta in Donizetti’s “L’elisir d’amore”, Juliette Vermont Lehár’s “The Count of Luxembourg”, Fire’s Shadow/Princess’ Shadow/The Nightingale in Ravel’s “L’enfant et les sortileges” and Eurydike in Offenbach’s “Orpheus in the Underworld”. She has also appeared in drama roles and played Eliza Doolittle in Loewe’s “My Fair Lady”.

Personal life
In December 2017, she anglicized her stage name changing its spelling from Netšajeva to Nechayeva, with the same pronunciation.

She is of mixed Chuvash, Estonian, and Russian ancestry, notably becoming the first Eurovision participant of Chuvash descent.

Discography

Singles

Albums

References

External links

1991 births
Living people
Singers from Tallinn
Estonian Academy of Music and Theatre alumni
Estonian sopranos
Idols (franchise) participants
Estonian people of Russian descent
Estonian people of Chuvash descent
21st-century Estonian women singers
Eurovision Song Contest entrants of 2018
Eurovision Song Contest entrants for Estonia
Eesti Laul winners
Tallinn French School alumni